The 2015–16 National League 2 South is the seventh season (29th overall) of the fourth tier (south) of the English domestic rugby union competitions since the professionalised format of the second division was introduced. There was talk of this being the last season in this format due to RFU changes to tier four which were supposed to result in a restructuring of the league from two regional divisions (north and south) to three (north, south-east and south-west) for the 2016–17 season but this seems to have been put on hold due to protests from the northern clubs who stood to lose revenue from a smaller fixture list.  

New faces to the division include Old Albanians (relegated from National League 1), Bury St Edmunds and Barnes (both promoted from National League 3 London & SE) and Redingensians Rams (promoted from National League 3 South West).  The league system is 4 points for a win, 2 points for a draw and additional bonus points being awarded for scoring 4 or more tries and/or losing within 7 points of the victorious team.  In terms of promotion the league champions are promoted to National League 1 while the second-placed team play-off against the second-placed team from National League 2 North (at the home ground of the club with the superior league record) for the final promotion place. During the course of the season the two league derby games between the Launceston and Redruth also double up as the Cornish Super Cup with Redruth being the defending 2014–15 champions. Redruth retained the cup, winning the Christmas fixture at the Recreation Ground 17 – 0 before winning away at Polson Bridge 34 – 17 to take the cup 51 – 17 on aggregate. 

After a truly dreadful season, Launceston were the first team to be relegated, losing 13 – 19 away to relegation rivals Southend Saxons on the 5 March 2016 with seven games still left to play. The relegation of the Cornish club was not surprising to many of the fans at Polson Bridge as they had lost almost a full team to Plymouth Albion during the pre-season — victims of both Albion's relegation from the Championship and that the Albion director of rugby, Graham Dawe, having coached (and subsequently signed) many of the Launceston players while in charge of the Cornwall team that had won the 2015 Bill Beaumont Cup.  This, coupled by the club being on their third head coach in a little over a year, contributed to what was perhaps the worst season in the club's league history with the club failing to win a game and conceding over 1,000 points (it was also one of the poorest performances in National League 2, comparable with Newbury in 2010–11 who at least managed to win a game). 

The remaining relegation places were much more keenly contested with Southend Saxons — who had only just survived the previous season — being the next team to be relegated with three games to go after losing 36 – 15 away to high flying Cambridge. The third and final relegation place fell to Dorking — who had finished 6th the previous season — losing 32 – 20 away to relegation rivals Worthing Raiders in round 29 of the competition, to condemn the Surrey-based club to the drop with one game still to go.  Launceston would drop to National League 3 South West while Southend and Dorking would go into National League 3 London & SE. 

While the relegation spots were fairly cut and dried, the championship went right to the wire, being keenly contested by two sides — Cambridge and Old Albanian — who were way ahead of the trailing pack.  Cambridge ended up the league champions by just two points, after both sides won their last games, having almost blown it the week before by losing their derby fixture against Bury St Edmunds, but managed to claim two bonus points during the defeat. This, combined with Cambridge's home and away victories against Old Albanian, meant that they claimed the title and a return to National League 1 after a three-year absence.  After just missing out on the league title, Old Albanian had a second shot at promotion when they hosted the promotion playoff game against 2015–16 National League 2 North runners up,  Sedgley Park, with home advantage given due to having the superior league record.  Old Albanian proved their class by defeating the northern side, 24 - 0, and returned to the 2016–17 National League 1 after just one year away.

Structure
The league consists of sixteen teams with all the teams playing each other on a home and away basis to make a total of thirty matches each. There is one automatic promotion place, one play-off place and three relegation places. The champions are promoted to the 2016–17 National League 1 and the runners-up play the second-placed team in the 2015–16 National League 2 North with the winner being promoted. The last three teams are relegated to either National League 3 London & SE or National League 3 South West depending on the geographical location of the team (in some cases teams may join the Midlands regional leagues).

Participating teams and locations
Twelve of the teams listed below participated in the 2014–15 National League 2 South season; Old Albanians were relegated from the 2014–15 National League 1, Bury St Edmunds (champions) and Barnes (play-off) were promoted from National League 3 London & SE, Redingensians Rams (champions) were promoted from National League 3 South West.

League table

Results

Round 1

Round 2

Round 3

Round 4

Round 5

Round 6

Round 7

Round 8

Round 9

Round 10

Round 11

Round 12

Round 13

Round 14

Round 15

Round 16 

Postponed due to adverse weather conditions.  Game rescheduled to 27 February 2016.

Round 17 

Postponed due to unplayable pitch caused by heavy rain.  Game rescheduled to 12 March 2016.

Round 18

Round 19

Round 20

Round 21 

Postponed due to heavy rain and high winds.  Game rescheduled to 27 February 2016. 

Postponed due to waterlogged pitch caused by heavy rain.  Game rescheduled to 27 February 2016. 

Postponed due to waterlogged pitch caused by heavy rain.  Game rescheduled to 27 February 2016.

Round 22 

Postponed due to unplayable pitch caused by heavy rain.  Game rescheduled to 12 March 2016.

Round 23

Rounds 16 & 21 (rescheduled games) 

Game rescheduled from 6 February 2016.

Game rescheduled from 6 February 2016.

Game rescheduled from 2 January 2016.

Game rescheduled from 6 February 2016.

Round 24

Launceston are relegated.

Rounds 17 & 22 (rescheduled games)

Game rescheduled from 13 February 2016.

Game rescheduled from 9 January 2016.

Round 25

Round 26

Round 27

Round 28 

Southend Saxons are relegated.

Round 29 

Dorking are relegated.

Round 30

Promotion play-off
Each season, the runners-up in the National League 2 South and National League 2 North participate in a play-off for promotion to National Division 1. Old Albanian having the best record hosted the match against the north runner-up, Sedgley Park.

Attendances
Does not include promotion play-off.

Individual statistics
 Note that points scorers includes tries as well as conversions, penalties and drop goals. Appearance figures also include coming on as substitutes (unused substitutes not included).  Does not include promotion playoff.

Top points scorers

Top try scorers

Season records

Team
Largest home win — 109 pts
109 - 0 Cambridge at home to Launceston on 2 April 2016
Largest away win — 79 pts
79 - 0 Bury St Edmunds away to Launceston on 19 March 2016
Most points scored — 79 pts
79 - 0 Bury St Edmunds away to Launceston on 19 March 2016
Most tries in a match — 17
Cambridge at home to Launceston on 2 April 2016
Most conversions in a match — 12
Cambridge at home to Launceston on 2 April 2016
Most penalties in a match — 5 (x3)
Worthing Raiders at home to Taunton Titans on 12 December 2015
Canterbury at home to Redingensians Rams on 9 January 2016
Old Elthamians at home to Canterbury on 23 April 2016
Most drop goals in a match — 1
N/A - multiple teams

Player
Most points in a match — 30
 Oscar Heath for Chinnor at home to Southend Saxons on 30 April 2016
Most tries in a match — 5 (x2)
 Nick Mason for Taunton Titans at home to Launceston on 12 March 2016
 Michael Ayrton for Cambridge at home to Launceston on 2 April 2016
Most conversions in a match — 12
 Gerhard Boshoff for Cambridge at home to Launceston on 2 April 2016
Most penalties in a match — 5 (x2)
 Matthew McLean for Worthing Raiders at home to Taunton Titans on 12 December 2015
 Tom Best for Canterbury at home to Redingensians Rams on 9 January 2016
 Tom White for Old Elthamians at home to Canterbury on 23 April 2016
Most drop goals in a match — 1
N/A - multiple players

Attendances
Highest — 1,145
Cambridge at home to Dorking on 30 April 2016
Lowest — 72 
Barnes at home to Taunton Titans on 2 January 2016   
Highest Average Attendance — 796
Redruth
Lowest Average Attendance — 129
Barnes

See also
 English rugby union system
 Rugby union in England

References

External links
 NCA Rugby

2015–16
2015–16 in English rugby union leagues